Kizhake Palat Sankara Menon was an Indian diplomat.

Early life and background 
He was the son of K. P. S. Menon Sr. Menon studied at The Doon School, and St. Stephen's College in Delhi and later at the Oxford University.

Career 
He joined the Indian Foreign Service in 1951. He served as the Indian ambassador to China, and later as the Foreign Secretary.

Menon died in Thiruvananthapuram at the age of 90 and was cremated.

References 

Ambassadors of India to Japan
Ambassadors of India to Egypt
Ambassadors of India to China
High Commissioners of India to Bangladesh
1929 births
2019 deaths